Doris Mary Green (6 August 1904 – 11 March 1999) was a British philatelist who was added to the Roll of Distinguished Philatelists in 1970.

References

Signatories to the Roll of Distinguished Philatelists
1904 births
1999 deaths
British philatelists
Women philatelists